Wallacer de Andrade Medeiros (born June 3, 1986 in Macaé), known as Wallacer, is a Brazilian footballer who plays as forward for Esporte Clube Pelotas.

Career
Wallacer joined Persipura Jayapura on 12 February 2019. He left the club again in May 2019 because the club was missing some of the players documents from his former club.

Career statistics

References

External links

Wallacer at ZeroZero

1986 births
Living people
Brazilian footballers
Brazilian expatriate footballers
Association football forwards
Volta Redonda FC players
Macaé Esporte Futebol Clube players
Clube Atlético Bragantino players
Sociedade Esportiva e Recreativa Caxias do Sul players
Esporte Clube Juventude players
Operário Ferroviário Esporte Clube players
Criciúma Esporte Clube players
Clube do Remo players
Persipura Jayapura players
Esporte Clube Pelotas players
Brazilian expatriate sportspeople in Indonesia
Expatriate footballers in Indonesia
People from Macaé
Sportspeople from Rio de Janeiro (state)